Sainte-Rose is a commune on the east coast of the French island and department of Réunion.

Geography 

The commune is bordered by the communes of La Plaine-des-Palmistes, Saint-Benoît, Saint-Joseph, Saint-Philippe and Tampon; and by the Rivière de l'Est to the nord. Sainte-Rose is home to the first wind farm on the island, built in 2004.

The "Pointe des Cascades", in the commune, is the easternmost part of the island and also the easternmost part of France and of the European Union.

Climate

Sainte-Rose features a tropical rainforest climate (Köppen Af), with substantial rainfall throughout the course of the year. Its location on the eastern side of Réunion, (windward relative to the trade winds), makes it one of the wettest cities in the world, along with Cherrapunji, Quibdó, and López de Micay.

History 
The village of Piton Sainte-Rose was partially destroyed by a lava flow in April 1977.

Population

See also
Communes of the Réunion department

References

External links

CIREST Site

Communes of Réunion